Fox Villa is a Nicaraguan football team currently playing in the Nicaraguan Primera División. They are based in Jinotepe.

History
The Club won promotion to the second division during the 2012 season for the first time in the club's history. During 2013 Apertura and 2014 Clausura despite failing to win either tournament their strong aggregate record meant they reached a promotion/relegation playoff against San Marcos F.C. for a chance to gain promotion in the Primera Division, which they won 2-0 making their first appearance in the Primera Division. Fox Villa's first appearance in the Primera Division was an unhappy experience as they lost all 18 games and became the first team in Nicaraguan history to do this.

Current squad

Achievements
Segunda División de Nicaragua: 0
TBD

List of Coaches
  Mario Aburto Alegría (2014-2015)

References

External links
 Profile - GoolNica

Football clubs in Nicaragua